Derek Malawsky (born September 6, 1973) is a Canadian lacrosse player for the Edmonton Rush in the National Lacrosse League. Derek's brother Curt also plays in the NLL, and the two have played together in Rochester, San Jose, and again in Arizona.

Professional career
Malawsky was selected 11th overall in the 1997 National Lacrosse League draft by the Ontario Raiders out of Sonoma State University. He also played on the 2002 Canadian National Team.

After the cancellation and subsequent reinstatement of the 2008 season, the Arizona Sting and Boston Blazers announced that they would not be playing in 2008. A dispersal draft was held, and Malawsky was selected by the Portland LumberJax.  When the Arizona Sting ceased operations prior to the 2009 NLL season, another dispersal draft was held, and Malawsky was again selected by the Portland LumberJax. On July 7, 2009, Malawsky was again selected in the Dispersal Draft, this time by the Philadelphia Wings as the 26th overall selection, but was subsequently traded by the Wings to the Edmonton Rush for Dan Teat.

Statistics

NLL

References

1973 births
Living people
Arizona Sting players
Buffalo Bandits players
Canadian lacrosse players
Edmonton Rush players
National Lacrosse League All-Stars
People from Coquitlam
Portland LumberJax players
Rochester Knighthawks players
San Jose Stealth players
Sportspeople from British Columbia